Paul Lawrence Berezney (born September 25, 1915 – March 29, 1990) was an American football offensive tackle in the National Football League. He played 31 games for the Green Bay Packers between 1942 and 1944, starting in 23. Berezney was the starting right tackle for the Packers in the 1944 NFL Championship Game. After leaving the NFL in 1944, Berezney played in one game for the Miami Seahawks of the All-America Football Conference in 1946. His brother Pete Berezney also played in the AAFC.

Born in Jersey City, New Jersey, Berezney attended William L. Dickinson High School.

References

External links

1915 births
1990 deaths
Players of American football from Jersey City, New Jersey
American football offensive tackles
Green Bay Packers players
Miami Seahawks players
William L. Dickinson High School alumni